The canton of Les Herbiers is an administrative division of the Vendée department, western France. Its borders were modified at the French canton reorganisation which came into effect in March 2015. Its seat is in Les Herbiers.

It consists of the following communes:
 
Chavagnes-les-Redoux
Les Epesses
Les Herbiers
La Meilleraie-Tillay
Monsireigne
Montournais
Mouchamps
Pouzauges
Réaumur
Saint-Mars-la-Réorthe
Saint-Mesmin
Saint-Paul-en-Pareds
Sèvremont
Tallud-Sainte-Gemme

References

Cantons of Vendée